Cologne is an unincorporated community located within Galloway Township, in Atlantic County, New Jersey, United States. Cologne has a post office with ZIP code 08213.

Demographics

References

Galloway Township, New Jersey
Unincorporated communities in Atlantic County, New Jersey
Unincorporated communities in New Jersey